Bruno Miguel Esteves do Vale (born 8 April 1983) is a Portuguese former professional footballer who played as a goalkeeper.

He spent most of his professional career in Cyprus with Apollon Limassol after being formed at Porto, appearing in more than 300 competitive matches for the former club.

Career
Vale was born in Mafamude, Vila Nova de Gaia. A product of FC Porto's youth system, he was surprisingly picked for a Portugal match against Kazakhstan in August 2003, where he played 22 minutes as a substitute in a 1–0 friendly win; at the time, he was only third choice at his club. The following year, he represented the nation at the Summer Olympic Games, backing S.L. Benfica's José Moreira.

Subsequently, Vale played the 2005–06 season on loan to C.F. Estrela da Amadora in the Primeira Liga, also being selected to the 2006 FIFA World Cup. However, he injured his foot in a game against Germany in the UEFA European Under-21 Championship, and was forced to pull out of the squad.

In 2006–07, Vale was loaned again, to top-division side U.D. Leiria. He went almost unnoticed there, moving the following campaign to the Segunda Liga with Varzim SC.

Vale was yet again loaned in July 2008, spending 2008–09 at Vitória de Setúbal in the top flight. The same happened in the following summer, and he again was backup or third choice in the 2009–10 season, now at Lisbon-based C.F. Os Belenenses– an injury to Nélson Pereira eventually propelled him to the starting eleven, as the club suffered top-tier relegation as second-bottom.

In the 2010 off-season, Vale was finally released by Porto, resuming his career with U.D. Oliveirense of division two. On 26 June 2012, the 29-year-old moved abroad for the first time, signing a two-year contract with Apollon Limassol in the Cypriot First Division.

Vale returned to Portugal and Oliveirense after seven years in June 2019, with the 36-year-old agreeing to a one-year deal. On 4 June 2020, he announced his retirement.

Career statistics

Honours
Porto
Primeira Liga: 2003–04

Apollon Limassol
Cypriot Cup: 2012–13, 2015–16, 2016–17
Cypriot Super Cup: 2016, 2017

Portugal Under-16
UEFA European Under-16 Championship: 2000

Individual
Toulon Tournament Best Goalkeeper: 2003

References

External links

1983 births
Living people
Sportspeople from Vila Nova de Gaia
Portuguese footballers
Association football goalkeepers
Primeira Liga players
Liga Portugal 2 players
Segunda Divisão players
FC Porto B players
FC Porto players
C.F. Estrela da Amadora players
U.D. Leiria players
Varzim S.C. players
Vitória F.C. players
C.F. Os Belenenses players
U.D. Oliveirense players
Cypriot First Division players
Apollon Limassol FC players
Portugal youth international footballers
Portugal under-21 international footballers
Portugal B international footballers
Portugal international footballers
Olympic footballers of Portugal
Footballers at the 2004 Summer Olympics
Portuguese expatriate footballers
Portuguese expatriate sportspeople in Cyprus
Expatriate footballers in Cyprus